The Montezuma Downtown Historic District is a nationally recognized historic district located in Montezuma, Iowa, United States. It was listed on the National Register of Historic Places in 2012.  The historic district covers Montezuma's central business district, and includes the Poweshiek County Courthouse, Carter Hotel, and the Carnegie Library building.  Iowa architect Frank E. Wetherell has at least one building.

References

Victorian architecture in Iowa
National Register of Historic Places in Poweshiek County, Iowa
Historic districts on the National Register of Historic Places in Iowa
Historic districts in Poweshiek County, Iowa